The 2015 European Diving Championships was the fourth edition of the European Diving Championships and was held from 9–14 June 2015 in Rostock, Germany.

A total of eleven disciplines were contested.

Results
The complete list of results and medals was published by the LEN (LIGUE EUROPÉENNE DE NATATION)

Medal table

Men

Women

Mixed

See also 
2015 European Diving Championships – Women's 10 metre platform

References

External links
Official website

 
2015
2015 European Diving Championships
European Diving Championships
European Diving Championships
Diving competitions in Germany